Martina Hingis and Flavia Pennetta were the defending champions, but Pennetta chose not to participate. Hingis played alongside Sania Mirza and successfully defended the title by defeating Irina-Camelia Begu and Monica Niculescu in the final, 6–2, 6–3.

Seeds
The top four seeds received a bye into the second round.

Draw

Finals

Top half

Bottom half

References 
 Draw

Doubles